The 2013 Curlers Corner Autumn Gold Curling Classic was held from October 11 to 14 at the Calgary Curling Club in Calgary, Alberta. The event was the first women's Grand Slam of the 2013–14 World Curling Tour. The event was held in a triple knockout format, and the purse for the event was CAD$50,000. The winning team received $14,000.

Eve Muirhead's Scottish rink won the tournament with seven straight victories, a first in the bonspiel's history. She defeated China's Wang Bingyu in the final, which saw the first time the tournament featured two non-Canadian teams in the final. It is also the second straight women's slam to feature two non-Canadian teams in the final, which has only happened one time before in Grand Slam history. Muirhead, who won the 2013 Players' Championship in April, won her second straight slam.

Teams
The teams are listed as follows:

Knockout results
The draw is listed as follows:

A event

B event

C event

Playoffs

References

External links

Autumn Gold Curling Classic
2013 in Canadian curling
2013 in women's curling